Technologist may refer to:

 Applied Science Technologist, a Canadian professional title in engineering and applied science technology. 
 Architectural technologist, a specialist in the technology fields of building, design and construction.
 Cardiovascular technologist, a health specialist who uses imaging technology to help diagnose cardiac and vascular ailments.
 Chemical technologist, a worker who provides technical support or services in chemical-related fields.
 Civic technologist, a specialist capable of satisfying societal needs by exploiting technologies.
 Educational technologist, a specialist in tools to enhance learning.
 Electrical technologist, a person whose knowledge lies between that of an electrical engineer and an electrical tradesperson.
 Engineering technologist, a specialist who implements technology within a field of engineering.
 Industrial technologist, a specialist in the management, operation, and maintenance of complex operation systems.
 Information technologist
 Medical technologist, a healthcare professional who performs diagnostic analysis on a variety of body fluids.
 Polysomnographic technologist, a health specialist who administers overnight polysomnograms. 
 Professional technologist, a Canadian and Malaysian professional title in engineering and technology related fields.
 Radiologic technologist, a medical professional who applies doses of radiation for imaging and treatment. 
 Surgical technologist, a health specialist who facilitates the conduct of invasive surgical procedures.
 Technologist (magazine), a European science magazine.